Enkhjin Tseveendash (born May 2, 1994) is a Mongolian model and beauty pageant titleholder who represented Mongolia in Мiss Globe International 2010, Miss Friendship International 2010, Supermodel International 2012 and Miss World 2017 pageant. she is owner of Eden Design.

General references

Mongolian female models
1994 births
Living people
21st-century Mongolian women
Miss World 2017 delegates